ISFC may refer to:

Ikapa Sporting F.C.
 Indicated specific fuel consumption
International Society and Federation of Cardiology